Herbert Cooke may refer to:

J. Herbert Cooke, Australian politician
Herbert Cooke (football manager)

See also
Bert Cooke (disambiguation)
Herbert Cook (disambiguation)